Aglossa aurocupralis is a species of snout moth in the genus Aglossa. It was described by Ragonot, in 1891, and is known from South Africa.

References

Endemic moths of South Africa
Moths described in 1891
Pyralini
Snout moths of Africa